Hebra is a genus of sea snails, marine gastropod mollusks in the family Nassariidae, the Nassa mud snails or dog whelks.

This genus is unaccepted and is considered a synonym of Nassarius Duméril, 1805 .

Species
Species within the genus Hebra include:
 † Hebra junghuhni (K. Martin, 1895)
 † Hebra kondangensis (Oostingh, 1939)
 Hebra oberwimmeri (Preston, 1907)
 Species brought into synonymy 
 Hebra corticata (A. Adams, 1852): synonym of Hebra nigra (Hombron & Jacquinot, 1848)
 Hebra crenolirata (A. Adams, 1852): synonym of Nassarius crenoliratus (A. Adams, 1852)
 Hebra curta (Gould, 1850) : synonym of Hebra horrida (Dunker, 1847)
 Hebra horrida (Dunker, 1847) : synonym of Nassarius horridus (Dunker, 1847)
 Hebra nigra (Hombron & Jacquinot, 1848) : synonym of Nassarius nigrus (Hombron & Jacquinot, 1848)
 Hebra subspinosa (Lamarck, 1822) : synonym of Nassarius subspinosus (Lamarck, 1822)

References

 H. & Adams, A. 1853. The genera of Recent Mollusca arranged according to their organization. London : John Van Voorst Vol. 1(Parts I-VIII) pp. 1–256, pls 1-32.
 Peile, A.J. 1939. Radula notes VI, VII. Proceedings of the Malacological Society of London 23(5): 270-276, figs 38-40
 Galindo L.A., Puillandre N., Utge J., Lozouet P. & Bouchet P. (2016). The phylogeny and systematics of the Nassariidae revisited (Gastropoda, Buccinoidea). Molecular Phylogenetics and Evolution. 99: 337-353.

External links

Nassariidae